Imagocnus is an extinct genus of ground sloth from the Early Miocene (Burdigalian) Lagunitas Formation of Cuba.

Description 
This sloth resided in the Antilles and showed a range of body size, from Parocnus-sized to Megalocnus-sized or larger. Its relationships to other Antillean sloths are not immediately clear, though the genera Megalocnus and Parocnus, other ground sloths, are its most likely relatives.

See also 

 Pilosans of the Caribbean

References 

Prehistoric sloths
Prehistoric placental genera
Miocene xenarthrans
Burdigalian life
Miocene mammals of North America
Hemingfordian
Neogene Cuba
Fossils of Cuba
Fossil taxa described in 1994